Seinsheim is a municipality in the district of Kitzingen in Bavaria in Germany. It is best known for its connection with the comital Seinsheim family, which died out in 1958 with the exception of the princely House of Schwarzenberg branch of the family.

Mayor
Since 2020: Ruth Albrecht (born 1970)

References

 
Kitzingen (district)
Franconian Circle